Police Brothers is a 1992 Telugu-language film produced by Venkata Subba Rao under Prasad Art Pictures banner and directed by Mohan Gandhi. The film stars Vinod Kumar, Roja, and Charan Raj while Kota Srinivasa Rao, Babu Mohan, Manorama, and Delhi Ganesh play supporting roles. The music was composed by Sri. It marks the debut of screenwriter Posani Krishna Murali, who provided the story and dialogues for the film. The film was remade in Hindi as Muqabla.

Cast
 Vinod Kumar
 Roja
 Charan Raj
 Kota Srinivasa Rao
 Devan
 Babu Mohan
 Manorama
 Delhi Ganesh
 Paruchuri Venkateswara Rao
 Jyothi

References

External links
 

Indian action films
Telugu films remade in other languages
Films with screenplays by Posani Krishna Murali
1990s Telugu-language films
1992 action films
1992 films